Sera Azuma (東晟良, born 20 August 1999) is a Japanese fencer. She competed in the women's individual foil event at the 2018 Asian Games, winning the bronze medal. In 2019, she won one of the bronze medals in the women's foil event at the 2019 Asian Fencing Championships held in Chiba, Japan.

References

External links
 

1999 births
Living people
Sportspeople from Wakayama Prefecture
Japanese female foil fencers
Fencers at the 2020 Summer Olympics
Olympic fencers of Japan
Fencers at the 2018 Asian Games
Asian Games gold medalists for Japan
Asian Games bronze medalists for Japan
Asian Games medalists in fencing
Medalists at the 2018 Asian Games
20th-century Japanese women
21st-century Japanese women